August Evening is a 2007 film following the relationship between an aging undocumented farm worker named Jaime and his young, widowed daughter-in-law, Lupe. It was written and directed by Chris Eska, and released theatrically on September 5, 2008.

Cast
As appearing in screen credits (main roles identified):
 Pedro Castaneda as Jaime
 Veronica Loren as Lupe
 Abel Becerra as Victor
 Walter Perez as Luis
 Sandra Rios as Alice
 Raquel Gavia as Maria
 Cesar Flores as Salazar
 Grisel Rodriguez as Andrea
 Tom Spry as Jason
 Jeremy Becerra as Gabe
 Ethan Mallen as Matthew
 Amelia Castillo as Juana
 Richard Moreno as Manuel
 Rosalba Aguayo Villegas as Wedding Photographer
 Stella Romero as Grocery Cashier
 Benito Lara as Diego
 Marina Hernandez as Young 'Maria' at Cleaners

Reception
Stephen Farber of The Hollywood Reporter credits the film as "perfectly honed, naturalistic acting and visual lyricism".

Awards
 Winner, Independent Spirit Award for Cassavetes Award (given to a feature film made for under $500,000)
 Nominated, Independent Spirit Award for Best Male Lead (Pedro Castaneda) (others nominated in this category: Don Cheadle, Philip Seymour Hoffman and Frank Langella.)
 Winner, Target Award for Best Film, Los Angeles Film Festival
 Winner, Best Acting Ensemble, Los Angeles Film Festival
 Nominated, Gotham Independent Film Award for Breakthrough Actor (Pedro Castaneda)
 Winner, Maverick Award for Best Film, Woodstock Film Festival
 Winner, Best Film, Ashland Independent Film Festival
 Winner, Best Cinematography, Phoenix Film Festival
 Winner, Opera Prima Jury Award (Best First Feature), International Latino Film Festival – San Francisco Bay Area
 Winner, Best Actress, Zimbabwe International Film Festival (Veronica Loren)
 Winner, Texas Filmmakers Production Fund Award 2005, Austin Film Society
 Winner, Texas Filmmakers Production Fund Award 2006, Austin Film Society

References

External links
 
 
 
 

2007 films
2007 drama films
2000s Spanish-language films
American drama films
2000s American films